John Fitzgerald O'Dowd (born 10 May 1967) is an Irish Sinn Féin politician. He was a Member of the Northern Ireland Assembly for Upper Bann since 2003. He was previously the Minister for Infrastructure from May to October 2022 and the Minister for Education in the Stormont Executive from 2011 to 2016. He briefly took on the duties of deputy First Minister in 2011 while Martin McGuinness ran in the 2011 Irish presidential election.

Early career
O'Dowd was born in 1967 in Tullylish, a rural community between Lurgan and Banbridge. He had trained as a chef before engaging in politics. He began his political career serving for 14 years as a councillor on Craigavon Borough Council and previously served as a school governor. O'Dowd has served as Chair of Upper Bann Sinn Féin and a member of the party's Six County Executive, O'Dowd was leader of the Sinn Féin group on Craigavon Council. In 2003 he was elected as MLA for Upper Bann and in 2005 unsuccessfully contested the same-named Westminster constituency. Between 2007 and 2011 he was Sinn Féin group leader in the Assembly and served as Chair of the Public Accounts Committee before becoming a member of the Education Committee in 2008.

On the 13 May 2022, he was confirmed as the 'caretaker' Infrastructure Minister replacing Nichola Mallon of the SDLP who failed to retain her seat in the previous weeks election. He took office on 16 May 2022.

Acting deputy First Minister
After Sinn Féin nominated Martin McGuinness as its candidate in the 2011 Irish presidential election, O'Dowd took over the duties of deputy First Minister on a temporary basis from 20 September to 31 October 2011.

Personal life
O'Dowd is married and has three children.

References

1967 births
Living people
People from Craigavon, County Armagh
Sinn Féin MLAs
Ministers of the Northern Ireland Executive (since 1999)
Northern Ireland MLAs 2003–2007
Northern Ireland MLAs 2007–2011
Northern Ireland MLAs 2011–2016
Northern Ireland MLAs 2016–2017
Northern Ireland MLAs 2017–2022
Sinn Féin councillors in Northern Ireland
Sinn Féin parliamentary candidates
Northern Ireland MLAs 2022–2027